Asom Gana Parishad (Progressive), or AGP(P), was a regional political party in Assam, India.  It was formed by Prafulla Kumar Mahanta after he was expelled in 2005 by the Asom Gana Parishad for anti-party activities.

In the 2006 Assembly elections, the party won just one seat; namely that of Prafulla Kumar Mahanta.

In 2008, the party merged again with Asom Gana Parishad.

References

Asom Gana Parishad
Defunct political parties in Assam
2006 establishments in Assam
Political parties established in 2006